Giannis Maniatis (born 11 October 1956) is a Greek politician. He worked as a engineer and attended at the National Technical University of Athens. Maniatis served as a member of the Hellenic Parliament from 2004 to 2019, and as Minister of the Environment and Energy of Greece.

References 

1956 births
Living people
Place of birth missing (living people)
Government ministers of Greece
Environment ministers of Greece
Energy ministers
Greek engineers
National Technical University of Athens alumni
21st-century Greek politicians
Greek MPs 2004–2007
Greek MPs 2007–2009
Greek MPs 2009–2012
Greek MPs 2012 (May)
Greek MPs 2012–2014
Greek MPs 2015–2019
PASOK politicians
PASOK MEPs